Slovenijales Trgovina D.o.o is a trading company from Slovenia, founded in 1950s.

It specializes in sales of timber, wood and other material products for buildings and home furniture, and raw materials for carpenters. It is one of the largest companies of this sort in Slovenia and former Yugoslavia.

References

Construction and civil engineering companies of Slovenia